Vittefleur is a commune in the Seine-Maritime department in the Normandy region in northern France.

Geography

Population

Places of interest
 The church of St. Pierre and Paul, dating from the thirteenth century.
 The ruins of a sixteenth-century castle.
 A stone cross from the sixteenth century.
 The eighteenth-century chapel of Saint-Pierre at Crosville.

See also
Communes of the Seine-Maritime department

References

Communes of Seine-Maritime